Eryops (from Greek , , 'drawn-out' + , , 'face', because most of its skull was in front of its eyes) is a genus of extinct, amphibious temnospondyls. It contains the single species , the fossils of which are found mainly in early Permian (about 295 million years ago) rocks of the Texas Red Beds, located in Archer County, Texas. Fossils have also been found in late Carboniferous period rocks from New Mexico. Several complete skeletons of Eryops have been found in lower Permian rocks, but skull bones and teeth are its most common fossils.

Description 

It had an enormous mouth with many curved teeth like the frog. Its teeth had enamel with a folded pattern, leading to its early classification as a "labyrinthodont" ("maze toothed"). The shape and cross section of Eryops teeth made them exceptionally strong and resistant to stresses. The palate, or roof of the mouth, contained three pairs of backward-curved fangs, and was covered in backward-pointing bony projections which would have been used to trap slippery prey once caught. This, coupled with the wide gape, suggest an inertial method of feeding, in which the animal would grasp its prey and thrust forward, forcing the prey farther back into its mouth.<ref name= Rinehart&lucas2013>{{cite journal|last1=Rinehart, L. F. |last2=Lucas, S. G. |year=2013 |title=Tooth form and function in temnospondyl amphibians: relationship of shape to applied stress |journal=New Mexico Museum of Natural History Bulletin |volume=61' |pages=533–542 |url=http://paleo.cortland.edu/globaltriassic2/Bulletin%2061%20Final/40-Rinehart%20and%20Lucas%20(Metopo%20teeth).pdf}}</ref>Eryops was much more strongly built and sturdy than its relatives, and had the most massive and heavily ossified skeleton of all known temnospondyls. The limbs were especially large and strong. The pectoral girdle was highly developed, with a larger size for increased muscle attachments. Most notably, the shoulder girdle was disconnected from the skull, resulting in improved terrestrial locomotion. The crossopterygian cleithrum was retained as the clavicle, and the interclavicle was well-developed, lying on the underside of the chest. In primitive forms, the two clavicles and the interclavicle could have grown ventrally in such a way as to form a broad chest plate, although such was not the case in Eryops. The upper portion of the girdle had a flat scapular blade, with the glenoid cavity situated below performing as the articulation surface for the humerus, while ventrally there was a large flat coracoid plate turning in toward the midline.

The pelvic girdle also was much larger than the simple plate found in fishes, accommodating more muscles. It extended far dorsally and was joined to the backbone by one or more specialized sacral ribs. The hind legs were somewhat specialized in that they not only supported weight, but also provided propulsion. The dorsal extension of the pelvis was the ilium, while the broad ventral plate was composed of the pubis in front and the ischium behind. The three bones met at a single point in the center of the pelvic triangle, called the acetabulum, providing a surface of articulation for the femur.

The texture of Eryops skin was revealed by a fossilized "mummy" described in 1941. This mummy specimen showed that the body in life was covered in a pattern of oval bumps.

Discovery and speciesEryops is currently thought to contain only one species, E. megacephalus, which means "large-headed Eryops". E. megacephalus fossils have been found only in rocks dated to the early Permian period (Sakmarian age, about 295 million years ago) in the southwestern United States, primarily in the Admiral Formation of the Texas Red Beds. During the mid-20th century, some older fossils were classified as a second species of Eryops, E. avinoffi. This species, known from Carboniferous period fossil found in Pennsylvania, had originally been classified in the genus Glaukerpeton. Beginning in the late 1950s, some scientists concluded that Glaukerpeton was too similar to Eyrops to deserve its own genus. However, later studies supported the original classification of Glaukerpeton, finding that it was more primitive than Eryops and some other early temnospondyls. Supposed Eryops fossils also found in older Pennsylvanian epoch rocks of the Conemaugh Group in West Virginia also turned out to be remains of Glaukerpeton. In 2005, a skull clearly belonging to Eryops was found in upper Pennsylvanian epoch rocks of the El Cobre Canyon Formation in New Mexico, representing the oldest known specimen.

PaleobiologyEryops were among the most formidable early Permian carnivores and perhaps the only ones capable of competing with the dominant synapsids of the time, though because they were semi-aquatic, if not mostly aquatic, as suggested by long bone microanatomy, they probably did not come into frequent competition with synapsids.  Eryops lived in lowland habitats in and around ponds, streams, and rivers, and the arrangement and shape of their teeth suggests that they probably ate mostly large fish and aquatic tetrapods. The torso of Eryops was relatively stiff and the tail stout, which would have made them poor swimmers. While they probably fed on fish, adult Eryops must have spent most of their time on land.

Like other large primitive temnospondyls, Eryops would have grown slowly and gradually from aquatic larvae, but they did not go through a major metamorphosis like many modern amphibians. While adults probably lived in ponds and rivers, or may have ventured onto their banks, juvenile Eryops'' may have lived in swamps, which may have offered more shelter from predators.

References 

Carboniferous temnospondyls of North America
Cisuralian temnospondyls of North America
Pennsylvanian first appearances
Cisuralian genus extinctions
Eryopids
Taxa named by Edward Drinker Cope
Fossil taxa described in 1887
Prehistoric amphibian genera